The Nike Hoop Summit is an international men's basketball all-star game sponsored by Nike, held once a year since 1995, except from 2001–2003, which features the USA Basketball Men's Junior Select Team against a World Select Team of international players. The players demonstrate their skills and hope to attract attention from either NBA scouts or colleges. A number of current NBA players have participated in this event in the past.

In the 2010 edition of the event, Enes Kanter scored 34 points and surpassed the event's record of 33 points set by Dirk Nowitzki in 1998. In 2012, Shabazz Muhammad scored 35 points to break Kanter's scoring record. Bismack Biyombo recorded the first triple-double in Hoop Summit history in 2011 with 12 points, 11 rebounds, and 10 blocks.

14 players, all members of the World Team have been selected to play in two Hoop Summits: Jovo Stanojević (1995 & 1996), Alexandre Bachminov (1996 & 1997), Matthew Nielsen (1997 & 1998), Antonis Fotsis, (1998 & 1999), Boštjan Nachbar (1999 & 2000), Olumide Oyedeji (1999 & 2000), Alexis Ajinça (2007 & 2008), Dario Šarić (2011 & 2012), Andrew Wiggins (2012 & 2013), Karl-Anthony Towns (2013 & 2014), Jamal Murray (2014 & 2015), Thon Maker (2015 & 2016), RJ Barrett (2017 & 2018), and Kofi Cockburn (2018 & 2019).

Although it previously rotated American cities, the event has been hosted in Portland, Oregon since 2008. There was no Hoop Summit in 2020 or 2021 due to the COVID-19 pandemic.

Past games
The USA leads the all-time series 16–7.

Team records

United States
Points: 35 by Shabazz Muhammad (2012)
Rebounds: 14 by Bol Bol (2018)
Assists: 11 by John Wall (2009)
Steals: 5 by Ron Artest (1997), John Wall (2009), Tyus Jones (2014), and Markelle Fultz (2016)
Blocks: 9 by Kevin Garnett (1995)

World
Points: 34 by Enes Kanter (2010)
Rebounds: 16 by Charles Bassey (2018) 
Assists: 9 by Ben Simmons (2015)
Steals: 5 by RJ Barrett (2018)
Blocks: 10 by Bismack Biyombo (2011)

Stat leaders

Alumni selected in the NBA draft

240 total draft picks
USA: 163
World: 77
First Round Picks: 178
Second Round Picks: 62
Draft(s) with the most alumni picked: 2011 & 2012 (15)

See also
Nike Global Challenge

References

External links
 

Nike, Inc.
High school basketball competitions in the United States
Basketball competitions in Portland, Oregon
Recurring sporting events established in 1995
1995 establishments in the United States
Annual events in Oregon